Albert "Alec" Edward Fildes ( – ) was an English professional rugby league footballer who played in the 1920s and 1930s.

Background
Albert Fildes was born in Runcorn, Cheshire, England, and he died aged 75 in St Helens, Merseyside.

Playing career

International honours
Albert 'Alec' Fildes won caps for England while at St. Helens Recs in 1927 against Wales, in 1929 against Other Nationalities, and won caps for Great Britain while at St. Helens Recs in 1926-27 against New Zealand (2 matches), in 1928 against Australia (3 matches), and New Zealand (3 matches), in 1929-30 against Australia (3 matches), while at St. Helens in 1932 against Australia, and New Zealand (3 matches).

County League appearances
Albert Fildes played in St. Helens' victory in the Lancashire County League during the 1931–32 season.

County Cup Final appearances
Albert Fildes played right-, i.e. number 12, in St. Helens Recs' 17-0 victory over Swinton in the 1923 Lancashire County Cup Final during the 1923–24 season at Central Park, Wigan on Saturday 24 November 1923, and he played left-, i.e. number 11, and scored a try in St. Helens' 9-10 defeat by Warrington in the 1932 Lancashire County Cup Final during the 1932–33 season at Central Park, Wigan on Saturday 19 November 1932.

Club career
Due to being on the 1932 Great Britain Lions tour of Australia and New Zealand, Fildes and Alf Ellaby did not play in St. Helens' 9-5 victory over Huddersfield in the Championship Final during the 1931–32 season at Belle Vue, Wakefield on Saturday 7 May 1932.

Note
Known as Albert on saints.org.uk & englandrl.co.uk, and Alec on totalrl.com & rugbyleagueproject.org, the use of Alec may be due to a confusion with Alex Fiddes a Scottish rugby union (RU), and professional rugby league (RL) footballer who played in the 1930s and 1940s for Hawick (RU), and British Empire XIII (RL), and Huddersfield (RL).

References

External links
Profile at saints.org.uk
(archived by web.archive.org) Green & Gold makes its début
(archived by web.archive.org) Lions 'nil' Kangaroos
(archived by web.archive.org) Lions win in Dunedin

1901 births
1976 deaths
England national rugby league team players
English rugby league players
Great Britain national rugby league team players
Lancashire rugby league team players
Rugby league locks
Rugby league players from Runcorn
Rugby league props
Rugby league second-rows
St Helens Recreation RLFC players
St Helens R.F.C. players